Loboscelidiinae is a small subfamily of cuckoo wasps in the family Chrysididae. There are 2 genera and more than 40 described species in Loboscelidiinae, and they are parasitoids of walking stick eggs.

Genera
 Loboscelidia Westwood, 1874
 Rhadinoscelidia Kimsey, 1988

References

Further reading

 

Parasitic wasps
Chrysididae